Clonostachys rosea f. rosea, also known as Gliocladium roseum, is a species of fungus in the family Bionectriaceae. It colonizes living plants as an endophyte, digests material in soil as a saprophyte and is also known as a parasite of other fungi and of nematodes. It produces a wide range of volatile organic compounds which are toxic to organisms including other fungi, bacteria, and insects, and is of interest as a biological pest control agent.

Biological control 
Clonostachys rosea protects plants against Botrytis cinerea ("grey mold") by suppressing  spore production. Its hyphae have been found to coil around, penetrate, and grow inside the hyphae and conidia of B. cinerea.

Nematodes are infected by C. rosea when the fungus' conidia  attach to their cuticle and germinate, going on to produce germ tubes which penetrate the host's body and kill it.

Biofuels 

In 2008 an isolate of Clonostachys rosea (NRRL 50072) was identified as producing a series of volatile compounds that are similar to some existing fuels. However, the taxonomy of this isolate was later revised to Ascocoryne sarcoides.

See also 

 Entomopathogenic fungus

References

External links 
 Index Fungorum
 USDA ARS Fungal Database

Fungal plant pathogens and diseases
Fungi described in 1999
Bionectriaceae
Anaerobic digestion
Forma taxa